The Women's Javelin Throw event at the 2005 World Championships in Athletics was held at the Helsinki Olympic Stadium on August 12 and August 14. It was a high-quality contest where Olympic champion Osleidys Menéndez set a new world record whereas Christina Obergföll set a new European record.

Medalists

Schedule
All times are Eastern European Time (UTC+2)

Abbreviations
All results shown are in metres

Records

Qualification

Group A

Group B

Final

External links
IAAF results, qualifying
IAAF results, final
todor66

Javelin
Javelin throw at the World Athletics Championships
2005 in women's athletics